Alan David Dotti (born March 19, 1977) is a retired Brazilian footballer who played as a central defender, and is the assistant manager of Portuguesa.

Club statistics

References

External links

1977 births
Living people
Brazilian footballers
Association football defenders
Rio Claro Futebol Clube players
Associação Atlética Internacional (Limeira) players
Comercial Futebol Clube (Ribeirão Preto) players
Esporte Clube Juventude players
Esporte Clube Santo André players
J2 League players
Montedio Yamagata players
Brazilian football managers
Esporte Clube Santo André managers
Agremiação Sportiva Arapiraquense managers
Associação Portuguesa de Desportos managers
Brazilian expatriate footballers
Brazilian expatriate sportspeople in Japan
Expatriate footballers in Japan
União Esporte Clube players